Galindo may refer to:

People

Surname
 Aarón Galindo (born 1982), Mexican footballer
 Alba Galindo (born 1981), Colombian model
 Alberto Flores Galindo (1949–1990), Peruvian historian, social scientist, and essay writer
 Alejandro Galindo (footballer) (born 1992), Guatemalan footballer
 Alex Galindo (born 1985), Puerto Rican basketball player
 Álvaro Galindo (born 1982), Argentine rugby footballer
 Alvaro Galindo (born 1970), Ecuadorian/Colombian lawyer
 Ana Galindo (born 1987), Honduran swimmer
 Ana Galindo (born 2003), Mexican rhythmic gymnast
 Ana Galindo Santolaria (born 1973), Spanish skier
 Anisleidy Galindo (born 1989), Cuban basketball player
 Anthony Galindo, member of MDO pop/rock band
 Beatriz Galindo (c. 1465 – 1534), Spanish writer and educator
 Benjamín Galindo (born 1960), Mexican footballer
 Blas Galindo (1910–1993), Mexican composer
 Carlos Blanco Galindo (1882–1943), Bolivian military officer, lawyer and president
 Cavernario Galindo (1923–1999), Mexican wrestler and actor
 Cayo Galindo, Peruvian politician
 Crystal Galindo (born 1983), American artist
 Danilo Galindo (born 1963), Honduran footballer
 David Galindo Delgado (born 1975), Mexican politician
 Enrique Rodríguez Galindo (born 1939), Spanish brigadier general of the Civil Guard
 Eudoro Galindo (1943–2019), Bolivian businessman, diplomat, and politician
 Felipe Galindo Gomez (born 1957), Mexican-American Cartoonist and illustrator aka Feggo
 Gabriela Medrano Galindo (born 1983), Mexican politician
 Gerardo Galindo (born 1978), Mexican footballer
 Gonzalo Galindo (born 1974), Bolivian footballer
 Heriberto Galindo Quiñones (born 1951), Mexican politician and diplomat
 Hermila Galindo (1896–1954), Mexican feminist and writer
 Jaime Bailon Galindo, Spanish paralympic swimmer
 Jeremy Galindo, guitarist in American post-rock band This Will Destroy You
 Jorge Rivera Galindo (born 1978), Colombian footballer
 Juan Galindo (1802–1839), Central American explorer and army officer
 Juan Carlos Galindo, Colombian government official
 Laura Garza Galindo (born 1947), Mexican politician
 María Galindo (born 1964), Bolivian anarcha-feminist, lesbian activist, and psychologist
 Mario Galindo (born 1951), Chilean footballer
 Maykel Galindo (born 1981), Cuban footballer
 Miguel Galindo Garcés, Spanish skier
 Nacho Galindo (singer) (born 1959), Mexican musician and Christian artist
 Nacho Galindo (actor) (1908–1973), Mexican-American actor
 Philemon Galindo (1770–1840), British actor/Central American army officer
 Plácido Galindo (1906–1988), Peruvian footballer
 Ramón Galindo Noriega (born 1955), Mexican politician
 Regina José Galindo (born 1974), Guatemalan performance artist
 Reynaldo Galindo Pohl (1918–2012), Salvadoran lawyer and diplomat
 Rick Galindo (born 1981), American politician
 Roberto Galindo (born 1980), Bolivian footballer
 Rodolfo Galindo (born 1996), Mexican footballer
 Rudy Galindo (born 1969), American skater
 Samuel Galindo (born 1992), Bolivian footballer
 Samuel Lewis Galindo (born 1927), Panamanian businessman, politician and author
 Sergio Galindo (1926–1993), Mexican novelist
 Silvio Lagos Galindo (born 1978, Mexican politician
 Vicky Galindo (born 1983), American softball player
 Zeferino Torreblanca Galindo (born 1954), Mexican politician
 original surname of Prudentius of Troyes

Given name
 Galindo Garcés (died 844), count of Aragón
 Galindo, birth name of Prudentius of Troyes (died 861), bishop
 Galindo Aznárez I (died 867), count of Aragón
 Galindo Aznárez II (died 922), count of Aragón
 Galindo Mellado Cruz (1973–2014), Mexican drug lord

Places
 Galindo, Austin, Texas, a neighborhood in Austin
 Galindo, a former name of Villa Francisca, Dominican Republic
 21448 Galindo, an asteroid discovered in 1998
 Blanco Galindo Avenue, a road in the Cochabamba department of Bolivia
 Casas de San Galindo, a municipality in the province of Guadalajara, Castile-La Mancha, Spain
 Don Francisco Galindo House, an historic house in Concord, California
 Juan Galindo (municipality), a town and municipality in Puebla, Mexico
 Galindo, Austin, Texas, a neighborhood in Austin
 Galindo y Perahuy, village and municipality in Salamanca, Spain

Other uses
 IES Beatriz Galindo, a high school in Madrid, Spain
 Torneo Plácido Galindo, a football tournament in Peru
 1989 Torneo Plácido Galindo, the only instance of this tournament
 Virgins of Galindo, three Dominican sisters who were slaughtered and raped in 1822

See also